Sanguinolaria is a genus of saltwater clams, marine bivalve molluscs of the family Psammobiidae.

Species
 Sanguinolaria achatina (Spengler, 1798)
 Sanguinolaria ovalis Reeve, 1857
 Sanguinolaria sanguinolenta (Gmelin, 1791)
 Sanguinolaria tellinoides A. Adams, 1850
 Sanguinolaria tenuis Olsson, 1961
 Sanguinolaria vitrea Deshayes, 1855
Synonyms
 Sanguinolaria acuminata (Reeve, 1857): synonym of Hiatula diphos (Linnaeus, 1771)
 Sanguinolaria acuta Cai & Zhuang, 1985: synonym of Hiatula acuta (Cai & Zhuang, 1985) (original combination)
 Sanguinolaria africana Cosel, 1990: synonym of Sanguinolaria achatina (Spengler, 1798)
 Sanguinolaria antarctica Mabille & Rochebrune, 1889: synonym of Macoploma inornata (Hanley, 1844)
 Sanguinolaria atrata (Reeve, 1857): synonym of Hiatula atrata (Reeve, 1857)
 Sanguinolaria aureocincta E. von Martens, 1879: synonym of Sanguinolaria vitrea Deshayes, 1855
 Sanguinolaria bertini Pilsbry & H. N. Lowe, 1932: synonym of Psammotella bertini (Pilsbry & H. N. Lowe, 1932) (original combination)
 Sanguinolaria californiana Conrad, 1837: synonym of Limecola petalum (Valenciennes in Humboldt & Bonpland, 1821): synonym of Macoma petalum (Valenciennes in Humboldt & Bonpland, 1821)
 Sanguinolaria capensis (G. B. Sowerby III, 1889): synonym of Hiatula capensis (G. B. Sowerby III, 1889)
 Sanguinolaria castanea Scarlato, 1965: synonym of Gari chinensis (Deshayes, 1855)
 Sanguinolaria clouei (Bertin, 1880): synonym of Hiatula clouei Bertin, 1880
 Sanguinolaria cruenta ([Lightfoot], 1786): synonym of Psammotella cruenta ([Lightfoot], 1786)
 Sanguinolaria dichotoma Anton, 1838: synonym of Asaphis violascens (Forsskål in Niebuhr, 1775) (junior synonym)
 Sanguinolaria diphos (Linnaeus, 1771): synonym of Hiatula diphos (Linnaeus, 1771)
 Sanguinolaria elongata (Lamarck, 1818): synonym of Gari elongata (Lamarck, 1818)
 Sanguinolaria grandis Carpenter, 1857: synonym of Nuttallia nuttallii (Conrad, 1837)
 Sanguinolaria hendersoni Melvill & Standen, 1898: synonym of Salmacoma nobilis (Hanley, 1845)
 Sanguinolaria iridescens Benson, 1842: synonym of Iridona iridescens (Benson, 1842) (original combination)
 Sanguinolaria lamarckii Deshayes, 1824 †: synonym of Homalina lamarckii (Deshayes, 1824) † (unaccepted > superseded combination)
 Sanguinolaria livida Lamarck, 1818: synonym of Hiatula biradiata (W. Wood, 1815)
 Sanguinolaria lunulata (Deshayes, 1855): synonym of Hiatula lunulata (Deshayes, 1855)
 Sanguinolaria nivea Mörch, 1853: synonym of Sanguinolaria sanguinolenta (Gmelin, 1791)
 Sanguinolaria nuttallii Conrad, 1837: synonym of Nuttallia nuttallii (Conrad, 1837) (original combination)
 Sanguinolaria olivacea (Jay, 1857): synonym of Nuttallia obscurata (Reeve, 1857)
 Sanguinolaria orcutti Dall, 1921: synonym of Nuttallia nuttallii (Conrad, 1837)
 Sanguinolaria purpurea Deshayes, 1855: synonym of Sanguinolaria tellinoides A. Adams, 1850
 Sanguinolaria robertsii Tryon, 1870: synonym of Hiatula ambigua (Reeve, 1857)
 Sanguinolaria rosea Lamarck, 1801: synonym of Sanguinolaria sanguinolenta (Gmelin, 1791)
 Sanguinolaria tahitensis Bernardi, 1852: synonym of Asaphis violascens (Forsskål in Niebuhr, 1775)
 Sanguinolaria tchangsii Scarlato, 1965: synonym of Psammosphaerita tchangsii (Scarlato, 1965)
 Sanguinolaria togata (Deshayes, 1855): synonym of Gari togata (Deshayes, 1855)
 Sanguinolaria ventricosa Philippi, 1851: synonym of Asaphis violascens (Forsskål in Niebuhr, 1775)
 Sanguinolaria vespertina Pilsbry & H. N. Lowe, 1932: synonym of Sanguinolaria ovalis Reeve, 1857
 Sanguinolaria vitrea Deshayes, 1855 sensu Nicklès, 1952: synonym of Sanguinolaria achatina (Spengler, 1798) (misapplication)

References

 Huber M. (2010) Compendium of bivalves. A full-color guide to 3,300 of the world's marine bivalves. A status on Bivalvia after 250 years of research. Hackenheim: ConchBooks. 901 pp., 1
 Coan E.V. & Valentich-Scott P. (2012) Bivalve seashells of tropical West America. Marine bivalve mollusks from Baja California to northern Peru. 2 vols, 1258 pp. Santa Barbara: Santa Barbara Museum of Natural History

External links
 WoRMS
 Schumacher, C. F. (1817). Essai d'un nouveau système des habitations des vers testacés. Schultz, Copenghagen. iv + 288 pp., 22 pls.

 
Bivalve genera